Pranaya Meenukalude Kadal is a 2019 Indian Malayalam-language romantic drama film co-written and directed by Kamal and produced by Johny Vattakuzhi under the banner of Dani Productions. The film stars Vinayakan, Dileesh Pothan, Gabri Jose, Riddhi Kumar and Joe John Chacko. The film was released on 4 October 2019 by Frames Inevitable.

Cast
 Swathi subrammaniam as sakeena
 Dileesh Pothan as Ansari
 Gabri Jose as Ajmal
 Riddhi Kumar as Jasmine
 Jitin Puthanchery as Koyamon
 Joe John Chacko
 Sreedhanya as Dr Sulfat Beevi, Jasmine's  mother
 Saiju Kurup 
 Padmavati Rao as Bini Noorjehan, Jasmine's grandmother
 Kailash as Sulfat's husband
 Sudheesh as Damodharan
Ann saleem

Soundtrack 

The soundtrack is composed by Shaan Rahman and lyrics by BK Harinarayanan and Rafeeq Ahamed.

Release
The official trailer of the film was unveiled by Muzik247 on 4 September 2019.

The film was released, theatrically, on 4 October 2019. The film is available online from April 2020 onwards.

References

External links
 

2019 films
2010s Malayalam-language films
Indian drama films
Films directed by Kamal (director)
Indian romantic drama films
Films scored by Shaan Rahman
2019 romantic drama films
Films shot in Thrissur